Rombo  is a settlement in Kenya's Kajiado County. It is a Division in the Loitokitok Sub County and borders with Tanzania to the south and Illasit town to the west and Taveta to the south east.  Rombo is an agricultural dependant region. Agriculture is difficult due to the semi-arid climate which does not favor farming but irrigation is practiced through small irrigation schemes such as Kisioki irrigation scheme, Njoro and others. There are some Non governmental organizations which work to help Masai community who are pastoralists.

References

Rift Valley Province